The 1950–51 season in Swedish football, starting August 1950 and ending July 1951:

Honours

Official titles

Competitions

Promotions, relegations and qualifications

Promotions

Relegations

Domestic results

Allsvenskan 1950–51

Division 2 Nordöstra 1950–51

Division 2 Sydvästra 1950–51

Norrländska Mästerskapet 1951 
Final

Svenska Cupen 1950 
Final

National team results

Notes

References 
Print

Online

 
Seasons in Swedish football